OSL Consulting is an independent Gas and Oil design consultancy and engineering and project management company headquartered in Kingston upon Hull, United Kingdom. It also has offices in Aberdeen and Great Yarmouth. Its employees include engineers, consultants and project managers, providing services to the oil, gas and energy sectors.

History
Founded in 2005, incorporated as Optimus Services Limited, it is today known as OSL Consulting. The company started work on small offshore modification projects and terminal design, evolving to deliver a range of services, from feasibility studies to large design projects across the world.

Overview
OSL Consulting provides front-end engineering and design optimisation for Oil and Gas Processing, Transport and Storage - onshore, offshore and subsea. OSL works in the energy sector, including environmentally friendly technologies such as carbon capture, Biofuel and Biogas.

Projects
OSL has its main client base in the gas processing and transport/storage sectors and has worked on projects in Germany, Norway, Africa, North America and the Middle East. The company has worked on projects for Total, BP, Perenco, I. M. Skaugen, Murphy, EKB, Scottish and Southern Energy and ConocoPhillips.

EKB Project
In 2008, OSL, Freightliner Road, in Hull took on the EKB project. The EKB Project is based in north-west Germany in Etzel, 30 km south of Wilhelmshaven. The project plan designated the three companies to build an innovative storage facility for natural gas. OSL was initially appointed to supervise the Front End Engineering Design stage of the project in Copenhagen by EKB (a joint venture company formed between BP, Dong Energy, and Gazprom Germania). As the project developed, EKB asked OSL to modify the design. This demand eventually led to the doubling in size of the firm's team of engineers. Nick Jones, a principal director at OSL's head office, commented on this issue by stating,
"Over the past five years, we have provided a variety of support services to EKB, covering the technical and commercial aspects of managing the project. This has provided OSL with far more in-depth involvement in the project than we originally envisaged and allowed us to demonstrate our skills in finding the right solutions for our client at various key stages."

In late 2010, the project's construction and commissioning phase was under the supervision of OSL's technical team. In the meantime, a new design team was formed to finish some of the detailed engineering work. In addition, OSL assisted EKB in shifting the facility from an unmanned operation to a fully staffed operation. OSL is currently providing full engineering support service to EKB. Overall, the facility is connected to the Dutch gas transmission system by a 60 km pipeline. Allowing it access to one of the most important natural gas trading hubs in Europe.

Projects in Nigeria
In 2012, OSL were awarded their first project in Nigeria.  The firm says it is well placed to secure more major contracts in Africa after completing the first stage of a multi-million pound fuel supply development near Lagos.  This involved shaping the design and plans for the Liquid Petroleum Gas (LPG) storage and distribution facility at Apapa.

Once completed, the $30m Apapa scheme will provide users with LPG - a cleaner alternative to the government-subsidised household kerosene, and regarded as the fuel of the future in Nigeria. OSL have been working in partnership with Oando, Nigeria's largest Oil company, for the last five years.

Uti Kronakegha, a representative of the NIgerian Government's Department of Petroeum Resource, said:
"LPG is a clean fuel and has social economic benefits. By making it more available to our people, it will [sic] greatly enhance their lives. It is also very important for us to see our people benefit from the transfer of skills, expertise and technology that OSL have brought to this project."

Awards
OSL was voted Yorkshire’s top international performer by a group of business organisations.
ICheme Bronze Corporate Partnership

Accreditations
ACS Registrars ISO 9001
IChemE’s Accredited Company Training Scheme (ACTS)
FPAL registered empowered by Achilles

References

Engineering consulting firms of the United Kingdom
Companies based in Kingston upon Hull